The discography of Adelitas Way, an American hard rock band, consists of six studio albums, two extended plays, eleven music videos and twenty-seven singles.

Albums

Studio albums

Extended plays

Singles

Promotional singles

Music videos

References

Discographies of American artists
Alternative rock discographies